"In the Time It Takes" is a song written and performed by Beth Nielsen Chapman, released as a radio-only single from her second album You Hold the Key. The song features vocals from Paul Carrack. It peaked at #25 on the Billboard Adult Contemporary Singles chart in 1993, and it stayed on the chart for 14 weeks.  On the Canadian singles chart, the song spent two weeks at its peak of #34.

Chart history

References

External links
 

1993 singles
Beth Nielsen Chapman songs
Reprise Records singles
Songs written by Beth Nielsen Chapman
1993 songs
Male–female vocal duets
Paul Carrack songs